Rev is an American speech-to-text company that provides closed captioning, subtitles, and transcription services. The company, based in San Francisco and Austin, was founded in 2010.

The company employs about 50,000 independent contract workers who transcribe audio for a low per-minute rate. The service is used by major companies including Amazon and Microsoft. PC Magazine named the service an "Editor's Choice" in 2018, and ranked it as the best transcription service of 2019.

References

Further reading

External links 

 

American companies established in 2010
Transcription services
Companies based in San Francisco
Companies based in Austin, Texas
Freelance marketplace websites